Agnieszka Radwańska was the defending champion, but chose to participate in the Open GDF Suez, which was held the same week.

Seeds

Draw

Finals

Top half

Bottom half

References

External links
Draw

Singles
PTT Pattaya Women's Open - Singles
 in women's tennis